The Gibson G-3 was a bass guitar by Gibson building on the design of the Gibson Grabber.

Introduced in 1975 as a companion to the Gibson Grabber, the G-3 (which stands for Grabber 3) introduced a new pickup scheme to the already established body style.  Instead of a sliding pickup as was present in the Grabber, the G-3 featured a so-called "buck-and-a-half" trio of single coils.  Along with a tone and volume control, the G-3 featured a three-way switch linked in with three Bill Lawrence single coil pickups.  The pickups were designed for a "bright/low" tonality and all three pickups were designed with different tonalities. In the up position, the neck and middle pickups would be activated, and, as they were wired out of phase, a humbucker effect would result. Likewise, in the down position, the middle and bridge pickups would be activated similarly.  However, when switched to the middle position, all three pickups would be activated, the neck and bridge pickups being in phase while the middle would be out of phase with both, hence the term "buck-and-a-half".

Notable players
Brian Cook - Botch, These Arms Are Snakes, Russian Circles, Sumac
Mike Dirnt - Green Day
John Entwistle - The Who
Kenny Vasoli - The Starting Line
Jeremy Davis - Paramore
Timi "Grabber" Hansen - Mercyful Fate
Julian Dimagiba - Young Rising Sons
Nik Bruzzese - Man Overboard
Billy Hamilton - Silverstein
Andy Patil - Matt Mays and El Torpedo, Bubbles and the Shitrockers
Pierre Kezdy - Naked Raygun, Pegboy, Strike Under
Kelly Groucutt - Electric Light Orchestra
Krist Novoselic - Nirvana

2012 Inspired Reissue 
In 2012, Gibson introduced a G-3 inspired model in their '70s Tribute Series.  Coined the Grabber 3 '70s Tribute Bass, this instrument borrows heavily from the visual aesthetic of the original G-3 while also retaining the "buck-and-a-half" pickup combination, albeit with modern Alnico V single coil pickups as opposed to the Bill Lawrence models used in the original; as well as having a more traditional pickup layout, as opposed to the pickups in the original which hugged closer to the bridge.

See also
Gibson Grabber
Gibson Ripper
Gibson S-1

References

Gibson electric bass guitars